Benning is a residential neighborhood located in Ward 7 of Northeast Washington, D.C. It is bounded by East Capitol Street to the south, Minnesota Avenue to the west, and Benning Road (for which the neighborhood is named) on the north and east. It is served by the Benning Road station on the Blue and Silver Lines of the Washington Metro.

Education
The District of Columbia Public Schools operates public schools. The District of Columbia Public Library operates the Benning Neighborhood Library.

References

Neighborhoods in Northeast (Washington, D.C.)